Alexander Grigorievich Khmelik (Russian: Александр Григорьевич Хмелик) (September 27, 1925 – December 12, 2001) was a Soviet-Russian screenwriter, playwright and director known for his creation of the children's sketch series Yeralash. He was formerly a head of All-Union Radio (1948–1950), a literary employee in the newspaper Pionerskaya Pravda (1951–1953), literary editor of the journal Vozhaty (1953–1958), head of the department of literature and art at the newspaper Pionerskaya Pravda (1958–1963), the editor in chief of the creative association of Youth Films at Mosfilm (1963–1969). He was also a deputy of the Gorky Film Studio from 1974 to 1987.

References

External links 
 Биография
 

Russian film producers
1925 births
2001 deaths
People from Alupka
Communist Party of the Soviet Union members
Soviet screenwriters
20th-century Russian screenwriters
Male screenwriters
20th-century Russian male writers
Soviet dramatists and playwrights
Russian dramatists and playwrights
Soviet male writers
Russian male writers